Andrew Berardini (born 1982) is an American writer known for his work as a visual art critic and curator in Los Angeles. Described as "the most elegant of all art critic cowboys", Berardini works primarily between genres, which he describes as "quasi-essayistic prose poems on art and other vaguely lusty subjects."

He has published articles and essays in publications such as frieze, Mousse, Fillip, Artforum, ArtReview, Art-Agenda, Paper Monument, Art in America, Public Fiction, Rolling Stone (Italy), Die Welt and the LA Weekly. A graduate with an MFA in Writing from the School of Critical Studies at California Institute of the Arts, Berardini has lectured on Art History and Cultural Production at the Southern California Institute of Architecture (SCI-Arc), and has been faculty at the Mountain School of Arts since 2008, in addition to guest lecturing widely. He previously held the position of assistant editor of Semiotext(e) Press and is currently Los Angeles editor for Mousse, senior editor for Artslant, contributing editor for Momus and Art-Agenda, and co-founder of the Art Book Review. As a curator, Berardini held appointments at the Armory Center for the Arts in Pasadena and LAXART in Los Angeles and in 2013 he organized and co-organized exhibitions at the Palais de Tokyo in Paris, the Museum of Contemporary Art in Los Angeles, and the Castello di Rivoli in Turin.

He is the past recipient of an Andy Warhol/Creative Capital Grant and the 221A Curatorial Residency.

In 2016, he was appointed writer-in-residence at the Institute for Art and Olfaction in Los Angeles and appointed a judge for the Sadakichi Award for Experimental Work with Scent for the Art and Olfaction Awards.

Publications

Books

 Danh Vo: Relics, Mousse, 2015. 
 Get In, with Brian Kennon, 2nd Cannons, 2011.
 Richard Jackson, The Rennie Collection, 2010.

Book contributions

 Phillip Guston’s The Red Sea The Collection, SFMOMA. 2016. 
 The City of Glass, Xavier Veilhan, Gallerie Perrotin, Paris. 2015.
 DO NOT TIRE. EVERYTHING IS OPEN: On Robert Motherwell, Paul Kasmin Gallery. 2015.
 Hand in Glove, Make.A.Match, Revolver Verlag. 2014. 
 Battle Painting. Leander Schwazer: Bikini. Museion, Bolzano. 2014. 
 Home is the Place You Left, Biography: Elmgreen & Dragset, Astrup Fearnley Museum, Oslo, 2014. 
 Your looks are laughable/ Unphotographable/ Yet you’re my favorite work of art Sarah Anne Johnson: Wonderland, CAM Raleigh. 2014. 
 Whitney Biennial 2012., Whitney Museum, 2012.
 Sarah Cain, LAND, 2012.
 Singapore Biennial 2011: Open House, Singapore Art Museum, 2011.
 Bas Jan Ader: Suspended Between Laughter and Tears, Pitzer Art Galleries/Claremont Museum of Art, 2010.
 5 Years: The Mountain School of Art. MSA, 2010.
 Desert Interviews, Or How To Jump Off the Roof and Not Hit the Ground: Piero Golia. JRP/Ringier & Jumex Foundation and Collection, 2010.
 Rotterdam Dialogues: The Critics, The Curators, The Artists. Witte de With Center for Contemporary Art, 2010.
 Yoshua Okon: US, Museo Carillo Gil, Yerba Buena Center for the Arts, 2010.
 All Time Greatest. Fellows of Contemporary Art, 2010.
 I like your work: Etiquette and Art, Paper Monument, 2010.
 Bruce Nauman: Untitled (leave the Land Alone) 1969/2009, Armory Center for the Arts, 2009.
 Hipnostasis: Raymond Pettibon and Yoshua Okon, Armory Center for the Arts, 2009.
 LA Potential, Basis-Wien, Vienna, Austria, 2009.
 2008 California Biennial. Orange County Museum of Art, 2008.

Translations and editorial

 Bruce Nauman: Untitled (leave the Land Alone) 1969/2009, Armory Center for the Arts, 2009.
 Hipnostasis: Raymond Pettibon and Yoshua Okon, Armory Center for the Arts, 2009.
 Jean Baudrillard, In the Shadow of the Silent Majority, translated by Paul Foss, John Johnston, Paul Patton, and Andrew Berardini (Los Angeles, CA: Semiotext, 2007.
 David Wojnarowicz: A Definitive History of Five or Six Years on the Lower East SideEdited by Sylvère Lotringer, Giancarlo Ambrosino, Chris Kraus, Hedi El Kholti, Justin Cavin. Research Editor: Andrew Berardini. 2006.

References

1982 births
American art curators
American art critics
American non-fiction writers
American translators
American editors
Living people
Art in Greater Los Angeles
American people of Italian descent